Jean Antoine d'Averhoult, baptized as Jan Anthony d'Averhoult (21 October 1756 in Utrecht –  26 August 1792 in Sedan) was a Dutch military officer and politician of French Huguenot extraction, who played a leading role in both the Patriottentijd and the French Revolution.

Personal life
D'Arnoult was born the son of Jean (Jan) d'Averhoult, a captain in the Dutch States Army and Gerhardina de Valcke, the daughter of a Groningen burgemeester. The father was a scion of a French Huguenot noble family (he was a Sieur de Guincourt), that was, however, not part of the Dutch nobility. A great-grandmother migrated to the Dutch Republic in 1691 after the Revocation of the Edict of Nantes in 1685 with her children, after her spouse died. The family had become fully acculturated as witnessed by the fact that Jan Anthony was baptized in the Jacobi church of Utrecht, that was in use by the congregation of the Dutch Reformed Church, and not in the Église Wallonne. But he was an excellent French speaker. The marriage of his parents went badly, as the father had the mother committed to a borstal-like institution, from which she was only released after his death. During this episode Jan Anthony was cared for by his paternal aunts, especially the spinster Josina Benjamina d'Averhoult with whom he would develop a strong attachment. He would never marry.

Career
A year after his father's death in 1773 d'Averhoult started his military career as a Cornet with the cavalry regiment Van Eck of the States Army. He received his commission as a lieutenant with the same regiment, and was later promoted to ritmeester in another cavalry regiment, Van Tuyl van Serooskerken. But in 1785 he resigned his commission. This may have been prompted by his political sympathies. Like many in the early 1780s in the Netherlands he became very critical of the policies of the stadtholder, William V, Prince of Orange and his regime, that was accused of mismanaging the Fourth Anglo-Dutch War. As a Freemason he was a member of the same lodge as Joan Derk van der Capellen tot den Pol, the author of the revolutionary pamphlet Aan het Volk van Nederland, published in 1781, that criticized both the current policies of the regime, and the oligarchic constitution of the Republic, with a regenten-class that monopolized access to political offices. A political movement of opposition to the Orangist, called the Patriots arose, of which d'Averhoult became a member.

In the Spring of 1785 d'Averhoult took a commission in the Turkije company of the Utrecht schutterij that was being rejuvenated by an influx of Patriot Free Corps members. As such he became a leader of the Patriot revolt in Utrecht, together with people like the student leader Quint Ondaatje, that overturned the old vroedschap and replaced it with a popularly elected city council in August 1786. D'Averhoult was elected one of the new members. The Orangist majority in the States of Utrecht did not accept this and moved the States to the Utrecht city of Amersfoort, while the Patriot minority remained in Utrecht. For the time being the Amersfoort States kept hold of the seat of Utrecht province in the States General, however. Meanwhile, the Amersfoort States convinced the stadtholder to garrison Amersfoort with States Army troops under his command. These troops threatened the safety of Utrecht city, as witnessed by the fact that the Amersfoort garrison in early May 1787 made an attempt to occupy the sluice in Vreeswijk, a strategic object. The Utrecht city authorities decided to thwart this attack. D'Averhoult was placed in command of the relief force that marched down to Vreeswijk om 9 May 1787. This resulted in the Battle of Jutphaas, that the Patriots under d'Averhoult's cool-headed leadership won.

Shortly afterward a constitutional crisis erupted in the States General. These were equally divided between three Orangist provinces (Zeeland, Gelderland and Friesland) and three Patriot provinces (Holland, Groningen and Overijssel), while Utrecht was leaning Orangist, and held the balance. In June 1787 the rival Patriot States of Utrecht demanded to be seated in the States General, supported by the three Patriot provincial delegations. Patriot Overijssel temporarily presided at the time, and provisionally seated the Patriot States. This led to riotous behavior by the delegation of the Amersfoort States of Utrecht, one of whose members, drew his sword in the meeting hall, and challenged d'Averhoult, who was a member of the rival Patriot delegation, to a duel. This may or may not have been held the next day in the Hague Wood, fortunately with only slight damage to the participants. The Amersfoort delegation was eventually restored to its position of sole representative of Utrecht in the States General, giving the majority to the Orangists. This was one of the proximate causes of the Prussian invasion of Holland That invasion met little resistance from the Patriots, though d'Averhoult again distinguished himself by repelling several Prussian attacks near fort Nieuwersluis, before his troops were overwhelmed, and he was made a prisoner of war. The Prussians treated him respectfully and he was released and allowed to join the Patriot exodus to Brussels, together with his aunt Josina d'Averhoult.

However, d'Averhoult soon moved on to France, where he claimed his old noble title, and French nationality on the basis of it. On the recommendation of his distant cousin the Marquis de la Fayette, d'Averhoult (now calling himself Jean Antoine) was able to get a commission as a lieutenant-colonel in the French army in February 1788, thanks to the fact that the Edict of Versailles of 1787 made him eligible to serve, even though he remained a Protestant. A few months later he was promoted to colonel. In 1789 he was made a chevalier in the Ordre de Mérite Militaire .

After the Storming of the Bastille he attached himself to his cousin, the Marquis de la Fayette, and together with the latter became a member of the faction of the Feuillants. In September 1791 d'Averhoult was elected a deputy for the Arrondissement of Sedan, in the Ardennes department in the new National Legislative Assembly.

As a deputy, and member of the Feuillants d'Avernoult opposed the Girondins, who were more radical. But in other respects he was relatively radical. He became a member of the Diplomatic Committee of the Assembly, in which he was a voice for taking an aggressive stance against the surrounding states, in which the French Émigrés were making difficulties for the new constitutional kingdom of France. He did not think that they were a serious threat yet, but he pointed to the example of the suppression of the Patriots in the Netherlands to show that it was better to nip such a threat in the bud. His proposal to have king Louis XVI issue an ultimatum to the German princes sheltering the émigrés was accepted on 29 November 1791.

But d'Averhoult did not wish or expect that France would go to war right away. His intervention did contribute to his popularity in the Assembly and on 8 January 1792 he was elected its president for the usual two weeks. On 17 January 1792 there was a new debate on declaring war on France's external enemies, in particular Austrian emperor Joseph II. D'Averhoult spoke out against it with the following argument:  This argument carried the day: the emperor Joseph was censured, but war was not yet declared. But this was only a temporary delay. The Girondins soon carried the Assembly in forcing a new government on the king, and in April 1792 forcing a declaration of war on emperor Joseph

France radicalized more and more, and the Feuillants lost their influence to the Girondins and the rising Jacobins. D'Averhoult nevertheless spoke out against the illiberal measures that were taken, like the reintroduction of internal passports, and the lawlessness of the Paris Mob.  For instance, he spoke out against the lawlessness of the Journée de 20 juin, even in vain demanding the sanctioning of the local authorities who had failed to suppress that riot. But external developments made his position untenable: the Prussians entered the war after issuing an maladroit ultimatum, in which they demanded the reinstatement of the king in his old powers (reminiscent of the demand to reinstate the stadtholder in September 1787). In the following furor d'Averhoult on 26 July announced that he resigned as deputy in the Assembly. He took a commission as Colonel of the 7th regiment of dragoons, and departed for the front in northern France.

The overthrow of the monarchy on 10 August 1792 precipitated the defection of the Marquis de la Fayette. And this brought d'Averhoult under suspicion also. On 18 August a warrant for his arrest was issued by the Assembly. He tried to flee across the border near Sedan, together with a servant, but they were intercepted by armed peasants who demanded to see his passport. In the ensuing fight d'Averhoult managed to shoot his way out (though his servant was arrested). D'Averhoult then tried to escape on his own, but was again intercepted by armed peasants. What happened next remains disputed. At some point someone, either d'Averhoult himself, or someone else, put a pistol to the top of his head and pulled the trigger. He died a few hours later, on 26 August 1792 of this wound in Sedan, where he had been transported, in the presence of his Dutch friend Daniël Michiel Gijsbert Heldewier. He was buried in the Protestant cemetery of the Faubourg du Fond de Givonne. He was mourned by his aunt, who soon returned to the Netherlands. But Princess Wilhelmina, the wife of the stadtholder, true to form, wrote to her husband:

Notes and references

Notes

References

Sources

1756 births
1792 deaths
Military personnel from Utrecht (city)
Members of the Dutch Patriots faction
1780s in the Dutch Republic
Political history of the Netherlands
Members of the Legislative Assembly (France)
People of the French Revolution
Feuillants
French military personnel of the French Revolutionary Wars
Politicians from Utrecht (city)
Suicides by firearm in France